Live at NEARfest 2007 is the first live album from Pure Reason Revolution, and was recorded live at the North East Art Rock Festival in June 2007. The live set includes many songs from their full-length debut, The Dark Third, plus a few new tracks that eventually appeared on their following studio album, Amor Vincit Omnia, specifically Deus Ex Machina and Victorious Cupid. The song Golden Disco is a rearrangement of the song Golden Clothes, which appears on the 2nd disc of the InsideOut European release of The Dark Third.

Track listing

"In Aurélia" (5:33)
"Borgens Vor" (2:30)
"Deus Ex Machina" (5:45)
"The Bright Ambassadors of Morning" (10:42)
"Victorious Cupid" (3:45)
"Voices in Winter/In the Realms of the Divine" (7:06)
"The Twyncyn/Trembling Willows" (7:36)
"Golden Disco" (3:05)
"Aeropause" (5:46)
"Apprentice of the Universe" (3:29)
"Nimos & Tambos" (3:48)
"Arrival/The Intention Craft" (8:36)

Credits
Jon Courtney - Vocals, Guitar, and Keyboards
Chloe Alper - Vocals, Bass and Keyboards
Jamie Willcox - Vocals, Guitar, and Keyboards
Paul Glover - Drums
Adam Whitaker – Mixing
Brett Kull - Recording and Mastering

References 
 NEARfest Records

External links 
 NEARfest Records
 NEARfest

Pure Reason Revolution albums
2008 live albums